Harold Lansdown (18 February 1900 – 18 April 1957) was an Australian cricketer. He played three first-class cricket matches for Victoria between 1924 and 1929.

See also
 List of Victoria first-class cricketers

References

External links
 

1900 births
1957 deaths
Australian cricketers
Victoria cricketers
Cricketers from Melbourne